Yuri Igorevich Zhuravlyov (born 29 June 1996) is a Russian football player. He plays as a centre-back for FC Torpedo Moscow.

Club career
He made his debut for the main squad of FC Kuban Krasnodar on 23 September 2015 in a Russian Cup game against FC Shinnik Yaroslavl.

On 22 May 2021, he signed a long-term contract with Russian Premier League club FC Ufa. He made his RPL debut for FC Ufa on 25 July 2021 in a game against PFC CSKA Moscow.

On 8 June 2022, Zhuravlyov joined FC Akhmat Grozny on a three-year contract. 

On 20 December 2022, Zhuravlyov moved to FC Torpedo Moscow on a long-term contract.

Career statistics

References

External links
 
 

1996 births
Living people
Russian footballers
Russia youth international footballers
Association football defenders
FC Kuban Krasnodar players
FC Volgar Astrakhan players
FC Ufa players
FC Akhmat Grozny players
FC Torpedo Moscow players
Russian Second League players
Russian First League players
Russian Premier League players